Leprus wheelerii, or Wheeler's blue-winged grasshopper, is a species of band-winged grasshopper in the family Acrididae. It is found in the southwestern United States and Mexico.

References

External links

 

Oedipodinae
Insects described in 1875